Ma Ya is Habib Koité & Bamada's second studio album.

Track listing 
All songs written and arranged by Habib Koité.  Lyrics translated by Assetou Gologo.
Track list:
 "I Mada"
 "Wassiye"
 "Ma Ya"
 "Bitile"
 "Sirata"
 "Foro Bana"
 "Sarayama"
 "Kumbin"
 "Mara Kaso"
 "Pula Ku"
 "Komine"
 "Manssa Cise"

Personnel
Habib Koité: Vocals, Guitars
Boubacar Sidibe: Guitars, Harmonica, Vocals
Abdoul Wahab Berthe: Bass, Ngoni
Baba Sissoko: Ngoni, Balafon
Souleymane Ann: Drums, Vocals

References 

1997 albums